On 5 August 2014, Andrey Alexeyevich Stenin, a Russian photojournalist, disappeared while covering the war in Ukraine. He was confirmed dead on 3 September 2014, having died on 6 August according to the Investigative Committee of Russia.

Background 
Andrey Stenin (also transliterated , 22 December 1980 – 6 August 2014) started his career as a writing journalist, working for Rossiyskaya Gazeta from 2003 and Gazeta.ru. In 2008 he turned to photojournalism. Since 2009 he worked as photo reporter for RIA Novosti. He was an experienced military photojournalist who had worked in Egypt, Syria, Libya, the Gaza Strip and other locations. He had won the "Silver Camera" prize in 2010 and 2013. Stenin was quoted after his death as having said, "Journalists are the eyes of the citizens and the world."

Disappearance and death 
Stenin was allegedly embedded with Russian-backed combatants in Ukraine. Critics have labelled his activity a part of the fabrication of war propaganda.  After Stenin's disappearance, Anton Gerashchenko, an official with Ukraine's Interior Ministry suggested in an interview with the Latvian radio station Baltkom that the photojournalist might have been detained in the conflict area by Ukraine's security services.

He went missing since 5 August 2014. The International Federation of Journalists (IFJ), the European Federation of Journalists (EFJ), Human Rights Watch and Amnesty International expressed their concern for Stenin's safety. Reports in August indicated that Stenin's remains were found along with the bodies of two others.

On 3 September Stenin was confirmed dead. Russia's Investigative Committee said DNA tests had confirmed Stenin's identity. According to the media he was in a vehicle traveling in a convoy of escaping civilians when the convoy came under heavy fire in an area controlled by the Ukrainian military and National Guard. Andrey Stenin was the fourth Russian journalist killed in Ukraine over a period of a few months. Igor Kornelyuk and Anton Voloshin, staff members of the VGTRK radio and television network, were killed in June near Luhansk. At the end of June, Anatoly Klyan, a cameraman of the First TV Channel, received a mortal wound near Donetsk.

Aftermath 

The UN issued a statement deploring his death, calling for its investigation and bringing those responsible to justice.

Stenin was awarded Russia's Order of Courage posthumously.

See also
 Material Evidence (exhibition)

References

External links 
 Ukraine must clarify status of Russian journalist

1980 births
2014 deaths
Russian photojournalists
War photographers
People from Pechora
Journalists killed while covering the war in Donbas
Pro-Russian people of the war in Donbas
Burials in Troyekurovskoye Cemetery